Liravi-ye Shomali Rural District is in the Central District of Deylam County, Bushehr province, Iran. At the census of 2006, its population was 2,397 in 478 households; there were 2,048 inhabitants in 472 households at the following census of 2011; and in the most recent census of 2016, the population of the rural district was 1,830 in 496 households. The largest of its 15 villages was Siah Makan-e Bozorg, with 702 people.

References 

Rural Districts of Bushehr Province
Populated places in Deylam County